Windows Open Services Architecture (WOSA) is a set of proprietary Microsoft technologies intended to "...provide a single, open-ended interface to enterprise computing environments.". WOSA was announced by Microsoft in 1992. WOSA was pitched as a set of programming interfaces designed to provide application interoperability across the Windows environment.

The set of technologies that were part of he WOSA initiative include:

 LSAPI (Software Licensing API)
 MAPI (Mail Application Programming Interface)
 ODBC (Open Database Connectivity)
 OLE for Process Control
 SAPI (Speech Application Programming Interface)
 TAPI (Telephony Application Programming Interface)
 Windows SNA (IBM SNA Networks)
 WOSA/XFS (WOSA for Financial Services)
 WOSA/XRT (WOSA for Real-time Market Data)

See also 

 Component Object Model
 Object Linking and Embedding

References

External links 

Inter-process communication
Windows communication and services
Architectural pattern (computer science)
Enterprise application integration
Service-oriented (business computing)
Web services
Component-based software engineering